The 1946-47 European Championship saw a change of format, where each nation played each other twice, instead of once, both at a home and away venue. This was the sixth competition and was won by England.

Results

Final standings

References

European Nations Cup
European rugby league championship
European rugby league championship
International rugby league competitions hosted by the United Kingdom
International rugby league competitions hosted by France